Protolophotus is an extinct genus of crestfishes, family Lophotidae.

References

Lophotidae
Fossil taxa described in 1957